Jon Rafman (born 1981) is a Canadian artist, filmmaker, and essayist. His work centers around the emotional, social and existential impact of technology on contemporary life. His artwork has gained international attention and was exhibited in 2015 at Musée d'art contemporain de Montréal (Montreal) and Stedelijk Museum Amsterdam. He is widely known for exhibiting found images from Google Street View in his online artwork 9-Eyes (2009-ongoing).

Biography
Rafman was born in Montreal, Canada. He holds an M.F.A. from The School of the Art Institute of Chicago and a B.A. in Philosophy and Literature from McGill University. He lives in Montreal.

Work

Rafman's work focuses on technology and digital media, often using narrative to emphasize the ways in which they connect users back to society and history. Much of his work focuses on melancholy in modern social interactions, communities and virtual realities (primarily Google Earth, Google Street View and Second Life), while still bringing light to the beauty of them in a manner sometimes inspired by Romanticism. His videos and art utilize personal moments intended to reveal how pop culture ephemera and subcultures shape individual desires, and will often define those individuals in return.

Kool-Aid Man in Second Life

Rafman's Kool-Aid Man in Second Life project consists of films and participatory tours around the virtual universe of Second Life, which is hosted by his avatar, a 3D render of the Kool-Aid Man. Rafman conducted these tours live, inviting audience members to take part in the exploration of the virtual world as he guided and contextualized the experience  Kool-Aid Man in Second life is a quasi-ethnographic tour of the wildly varied fantasies invented and pursued by denizens of the web’s murkier corners. Rafman describes this project as an exploration of new communities that formed as the internet became a ubiquitous aspect of modern life.

Collaboration with Oneohtrix Point Never

In September 2013, Rafman collaborated with Brooklyn-based experimental musician Daniel Lopatin, better known by his stage name Oneohtrix Point Never, on a music video for Still Life to accompany the release of R Plus Seven on Warp Records. The two later collaborated to create a two-part music video for Sticky Drama, from Lopatin's 2015 album Garden of Delete.

Nine Eyes of Google Street View

In 2008, Rafman started Nine Eyes of Google Street View, a long-term archival photo project which uses screenshots of Google Street View images as its source.  These images from across the world are arranged in a massive database and published in books, on blogs and as prints for his various exhibitions. Rafman later began to keep an ongoing Tumblr blog where he would post his Google Street View images.

Dream Journal

In 2016, Rafman's computer animated feature-length film Dream Journal premiered at the Sprüth Magers gallery in Berlin. Inspired by Rafman's habit of recording and animating his dreams, the film through a series of dream episodes explores the effects that technology and the internet have on the human psyche. Rafman has called the process of working on the film a form of "worldbuilding" with the desire to create a Boschian-like vision of our current hellscape. Its musical score was created by Oneohtrix Point Never and James Ferraro.

Career

Jon Rafman’s oeuvre has been situated within the Post-Internet art movement. He has risen to acclaim with his project Nine Eyes of Google Street View, which developed a distinctly post-internet approach to photography. His work has been included in numerous prestigious international biennials, including the 58th Venice Biennale, 13th Lyon Biennale, 9th Berlin Biennale, and Manifesta 11. 
In 2015, the City of Montreal and the Contemporary Art Galleries Association awarded Rafman the Prix-Pierre-Ayot prize for emerging artists.  Rafman represented Quebec twice as a finalist in the competition for the 2015 and 2018 Sobey Art Award. In 2018, Parisian fashion house Balenciaga commissioned Rafman to create an immersive LED tunnel for their Spring-Summer 2019 show. Rafman is represented by art galleries Sprüth Magers (Berlin, Los Angeles, London) and Seventeen (London).

In July 2020, accusations of sexual misconduct were leveled against Rafman on the instagram account @surviving_the_artworld.  In the wake of these accounts, the Hirshhorn Museum suspended a planned Rafman exhibit and his Montreal gallery broke off its relationship with him. Jon Rafman has denied these allegations.

In February 2022, Jon Rafman's film Punctured Sky (2021) won the KNF (Circle of Dutch Film Journalists) prize at the International Film Festival Rotterdam (IFFR).

In January 2023, rapper Lil Yachty released his critically acclaimed album Let's Start Here with Rafman's artwork on the cover.

Exhibitions

Solo exhibitions

𝐸𝒷𝓇𝒶𝒽 𝒦’𝒹𝒶𝒷𝓇𝒾, Sprueth Magers, London, January 2023
Minor Daemon, 180 Strand, London, January 2023 
Counterfit Poast, Sprueth Magers, Berlin, September 2022 
Egregores and Grimoires, Schinkel Pavillion, Berlin, September 2022 
Arbiter of Worlds, Ordet, Milan, February 2022 
You, the World, and I, La Casa Encendida, Madrid, October 2021 
Dream Journal, Oval Office, Bochum, September 2021 
Il Viaggiatore Mentale, Palazzina dei Giardini, Modena, September 2018
Jon Rafman, Carl Kostyál, Stockholm, Sweden, 2016
I have ten thousand compound eyes and each is named suffering, Stedelijk Museum, Amsterdam, May 2016
Jon Rafman, Musée d'art contemporain de Montréal, Montréal, June 2015
Annals of Time Lost, Future Gallery, Berlin, April 2013
A Man Digging, Seventeen Gallery, London, May 2013
You Are Standing in an Open Field, Zach Feuer Gallery New York, September 2013

Group exhibitions
 What  Wonderful World, MAXXI Museum, Rome, 2022 
 Ticket to the Future, Kunstmuseum Bonn, Bonn, 2021 
Rencontres d’Arles
Malmö Sessions, Carl Kostyál, Malmö, Sweden, 2019
Stockholm Dinner Sessions, Carl Kostyál, Stockholm, Sweden, 2019
Summer Show, Carl Kostyál, Stockholm, Sweden, 2017
Speculations on Anonymous Materials, The Fridericianum, Kassel, 2013
Museum of Contemporary Canadian Art, 2012
Palais de Tokyo, 2012
The Saatchi Gallery, 2012
New Jpegs, Johan Berggren Gallery in Malmo, Sweden, 2011
Free, New Museum, New York, 2010
Museum of Contemporary Art of Rome, 2010

Publications with contributions by Rafman
Communicating the Archive: Physical Migration. Regional State Archives in Gothenburg. Rafman's work was included, as was an essay by Sandra Rafman, on the archival impulses of Rafman's work.

References

External links

1981 births
Living people
Canadian digital artists
Canadian contemporary artists
Net.artists
Artists from Montreal
School of the Art Institute of Chicago alumni
McGill University alumni